Liberty Lake is a city in Spokane County, Washington, United States located adjacent to the eponymous lake. Located just over a mile (about 2 km) west of the Washington–Idaho border, Liberty Lake is both a suburb of Spokane, Washington and a bedroom community to Coeur d'Alene, Idaho. The population was 12,003 at the 2020 census.

Liberty Lake was named after a pioneer who settled near the lake, Etienne Edward Laliberte, later he changed his name to Steve Liberty. The town was previously called Arturdee.

History
Liberty Lake was officially incorporated on August 31, 2001.

Geography

Liberty Lake is located in the Spokane Valley, at  (47.656171, -117.086287).

The city is bounded by the Spokane River on the north from Hodges Road in the west to approximately Molter Road. At Molter the border shifts south to Interstate-90, which it follows to within a mile of the Idaho state line. Sprague Avenue marks the southern portion of the city limits in the east to Liberty Lake Road, from which it zig-zags west to Appleway Road at Hodges. The lake itself is located outside of the city limits about three blocks south of Sprague.

Liberty Lake is one of the fastest-growing communities in the State of Washington. Liberty Lake is south of the Spokane River from Otis Orchards-East Farms, Washington, east of Greenacres, Washington (now part of Spokane Valley, Washington), and west of Spokane Bridge, Washington, State Line, Idaho, and Post Falls, Idaho.

Areas east of Liberty Lake Road and areas north of Appleway Road lie on the relatively flat land along the floor of the Spokane Valley. Elevations there range from between 2,000 feet above sea level at the river to around 2,150 feet around Liberty Lake Elementary School. The areas west of Liberty Lake Road and south of Appleway Road show far more topographical relief, rising from around 2,100 feet to over 2,600 feet on Carlson Hill. Kramer Hill, which rises just beyond the eastern limit of the city, quickly rises to above 2,700 feet. While Mica Peak, which rises beyond the southern shore of the lake, climbs to nearly 5,100 feet.

Demographics

2010 census
As of the census of 2010, there were 7,591 people in 2,893 households, including 2,019 families, in the city. The racial makeup of the city was 91.3% White, 0.7% African American, 0.5% Native American, 3.5% Asian, 0.2% Pacific Islander, 0.8% from other races, and 3.0% from two or more races. Hispanic or Latino of any race were 3.0%.

Of the 2,893 households 40.0% had children under the age of 18 living with them, 56.9% were married couples living together, 9.2% had a female householder with no husband present, 3.7% had a male householder with no wife present, and 30.2% were non-families. 24.6% of households were one person and 8% were one person aged 65 or older. The average household size was 2.62 and the average family size was 3.15.

The median age was 35.2 years. 30.4% of residents were under the age of 18; 5.8% were between the ages of 18 and 24; 29.3% were from 25 to 44; 23.8% were from 45 to 64; and 10.6% were 65 or older. The gender makeup of the city was 48.3% male and 51.7% female.

2000 census
As of the census of 2000, there were 4,660 people, 1,771 households, and 1,347 families in the CDP. The population density was 1,091.8 people per square mile (421.4/km). There were 1,894 housing units at an average density of 443.7 per square mile (171.3/km). The racial makeup of the CDP was 93.69% White, 0.71% African American, 0.28% Native American, 2.60% Asian, 0.15% Pacific Islander, 0.56% from other races, and 2.02% from two or more races. Hispanic or Latino of any race were 2.23% of the population.

Of the 1,771 households 39.6% had children under the age of 18 living with them, 68.4% were married couples living together, 5.3% had a female householder with no husband present, and 23.9% were non-families. 19.7% of households were one person and 4.7% were one person aged 65 or older. The average household size was 2.63 and the average family size was 3.05.

The age distribution was 29.1% under the age of 18, 4.8% from 18 to 24, 33.1% from 25 to 44, 24.7% from 45 to 64, and 8.4% 65 or older. The median age was 36 years. For every 100 females, there were 98.5 males. For every 100 females age 18 and over, there were 94.8 males.

The median household income was $60,854 and the median family income  was $66,985. Males had a median income of $57,425 versus $30,828 for females. The per capita income for the CDP was $29,105. About 1.3% of families and 3.2% of the population were below the poverty line, including 2.7% of those under age 18 and 6.4% of those age 65 or over.

Community
The Liberty Lake area includes the incorporated city, with a 2021 population of 12,534, and an unincorporated area with more residents. The city was incorporated on August 31, 2001, and operates with a mayor–council government. There are seven members on the city council who are elected to four-year terms.

Media
The Liberty Lake Splash, a free community-oriented weekly newspaper is distributed in the city and in the Spokane Valley; the paper has a circulation of about 6,000 copies per week.

Education

Liberty Lake's public schools are serviced by Central Valley School District 356, which has three elementary schools, a middle school, and a high school.

Liberty Lake has a municipal library.

Notable people
 Lexie Hull, professional basketball player selected in the 1st round of the 2022 WNBA draft.
 Tyler Johnson, Liberty Lake native and back-to-back Stanley Cup winner with the Tampa Bay Lightning.
 Holland Pratt, class of 2018,  First Captain, United States Military Academy Corps of Cadets, 2021–2022, Rhodes Scholar
 Sam Brown, Defensive End for the University of Idaho Football team

References

External links
 Liberty Lake Official Website

Cities in Washington (state)
Cities in Spokane County, Washington
Former census-designated places in Washington (state)